Anne Gerety (July 3, 1926 – October 25, 2003) was the actress who played the voice of Aunt Beru in the Star Wars radio drama.

Gerety was born in New York City, and she was the sister of actor Peter Gerety.

In addition to her own acting, Gerety and her husband, Tom Hill, formed the Storefront Actor's Theatre, which operated from 1970 to 1990 in Portland, Oregon.

Filmography

References

External links
 

People from Long Island
1926 births
2003 deaths
American radio actresses
20th-century American actresses
Actresses from New York (state)
21st-century American women